The bust of Václav Štulc is installed at Štulcovy sady in Vyšehrad, Prague, Czech Republic.

References

External links

 

Busts in the Czech Republic
Outdoor sculptures in Prague
Sculptures of men in Prague